The 2014 Big South Conference baseball tournament was held from May 20 through 24.  The top eight regular season finishers of the conference's twelve teams met in the double-elimination tournament theld at Winthrop Ballpark on the campus of Winthrop University in Rock Hill, South Carolina.   won their third tournament title, and first since returning to the league in 2012, to earn the conference's automatic bid to the 2014 NCAA Division I baseball tournament.

Seeding and format
The division winners will be seeded one and two, and the next six finishers from the regular season, regardless of division, will be seeded three through eight based on conference winning percentage only.  The teams will play a two bracket, double-elimination tournament with the winners of each bracket facing off in a single elimination final.

Results

All-Tournament Team
The following players were named to the All-Tournament Team.

Most Valuable Player
Ryan Thompson was named Tournament Most Valuable Player.  Thompson was a pitcher for Campbell.

References

Big South Conference Tournament
Big South Conference Baseball Tournament
Big South Conference baseball tournament
Big South Conference baseball tournament